Morten Peter Meldal (born 16 January 1954) is a Danish chemist and Nobel laureate. He is a professor of chemistry at the University of Copenhagen in Copenhagen, Denmark. He is best known for developing the CuAAC-click reaction, concurrently with but independent of Valery V. Fokin and K. Barry Sharpless.

Biography 
Meldal received B.S. and PhD degrees in chemical engineering from Technical University of Denmark (DTU); his PhD work was supervised by Klaus Bock and focused on the synthetic chemistry of carbohydrates. From 1983 to 1988 he was a postdoctoral fellow in organic chemistry, first at the DTU, next at the MRC Laboratory of Molecular Biology at Cambridge University and then at the University of Copenhagen. In 1996 he was appointed assistant professor at DTU. Since 1998 he has led the synthesis group in the Department of Chemistry of the Carlsberg Laboratory.

Meldal developed several technological techniques and instruments for peptide synthesis near the start of his career. He developed the multiple-column synthesis used in peptide and organic synthesis instruments, as well as for assembling large split-mix libraries. He first presented the cycloaddition of acetylenes and azides used in peptide and protein conjugations, in polymers and in material sciences. Meldal's group has then showed this reaction to be orthogonal to the majority of functional group chemistries.

More recently Meldal has developed an optical encoding technique  and has focused on the merger of organic chemistry and peptide chemistry on solid support. He has devised a range of novel methods for the generation of N-acyl iminium ions in which combinatorial libraries of these compounds are generated and screened for substances with activity toward G protein-coupled receptors in cell-based on-bead screening.

In 2019, Meldal co-founded the company Betamab Therapeutics ApS, based on the concept of beta-bodies, i.e. peptide mimics of antibodies. The company closed in 2021.

Honors and awards 
Meldal was awarded the 2022 Nobel Prize in Chemistry, jointly with Carolyn R. Bertozzi and Karl Barry Sharpless, "for the development of click chemistry and bioorthogonal chemistry".

References

External links 

 

Danish chemists
1954 births
Living people
Carlsberg Laboratory staff
Nobel laureates in Chemistry
Technical University of Denmark alumni
Academic staff of the University of Copenhagen
Academic staff of the Technical University of Denmark
21st-century Danish scientists
21st-century chemists